Eilema pusilana is a moth of the  subfamily Arctiinae. It was described by Strand in 1912. It is found in Tanzania and Uganda.

References

 Natural History Museum Lepidoptera generic names catalog

pusilana
Moths described in 1912